An indirect election was held in Apia to elect the O le Ao o le Malo (head of state) of Samoa on 16 June 2007 after the death of the country's head of state for four and a half decades, Malietoa Tanumafili II, in May 2007. Former Prime Minister Tui Ātua Tupua Tamasese Efi was elected unopposed by the 49-member strong parliament. This O le Ao o le Malo election was the first to occur since Samoa gained independence in 1962.

Background 
The O le Ao o le Malo is the head of state of Samoa; established after independence in 1962. The position is mostly ceremonial. Although power is vested in the prime minister and their cabinet, the head of state can dissolve parliament, and no act can become law without their signature.

Parliament held the election after the death of the long-serving head of state, Malietoa Tanumafili II. The Constitution drafted in 1960 and adopted upon independence stated that two paramount chiefs, Malietoa Tanumafili II and Tupua Tamasese Meaʻole, representatives of "two of the four main family lineages", would serve as co-heads of state for life. After the death of both individuals, the legislative assembly would elect successive heads of state. Tupua Tamasese died in 1963, a year after independence. From then on, Malietoa served as the sole head of state until his death in May 2007. Per the Constitution, the two members of the Council of deputies at the time, Tui Ātua Tupua Tamasese Efi and Tuimalealiʻifano Vaʻaletoʻa Sualauvi II served as acting co-heads of state until a successor would be elected. Tui Ātua was the sole nominee to serve as the next head of state. Tui Ātua, a former prime minister and son of Tupua Tamasese, was previously the opposition leader and became a member of the council of deputies in 2004.

Eligibility 
Parliament elects the head of state for a five-year term. According to the Constitution, the legislative assembly may only nominate one individual to be head of state. 
For an individual to qualify to be head of state, they must be a citizen of Samoa, be eligible to run for parliament and not have previously been removed from the office.

Aftermath
Parliament unanimously elected Tui Ātua. He was sworn in at parliament for his first term on 20 June 2007.

References

Elections in Samoa
2007 elections in Oceania
O le Ao o le Malo election
Uncontested elections